The Basque Football Federation (EFF; , FVF) is the body responsible for managing association football in the Basque Country autonomous region. Its offices are in the Txurdinaga neighbourhood of Bilbao.

The federation manages several leagues such as the Basque Youth League and the Basque Women's Football League, as well as the Basque regional stage of the Federation Cup. It also organises Group 4 of the regionalised Tercera División (the fourth tier of the men's Spanish football league system), although unlike most parts of the country, the leagues at the fifth level and below are administered separately by provincial federations for Álava, Biscay and Gipuzkoa.

The federation organises and selects the Basque Country national football team which draws its players not only from the Basque Country autonomous region, but also the neighbouring Basque regions of Navarre and the French Basque Country. The women's senior national team also follows this model, but the various youth representative squads contesting nationwide competitions, and the Basque amateur-level selection playing in the Spanish stage of the UEFA Regions' Cup, are composed of players only from the Basque Country autonomous region.

The Basque Football Federation is part of the Royal Spanish Football Federation.

History
In the early 20th century, football federations were formed for each of the Basque regions of Biscay (1913, as the 'North Federation' with Cantabria) and Gipuzkoa (a 1918 offshoot), with each holding their own tournaments (the Biscay Championship and Gipuzkoa Championship respectively). As long ago as 1931 the idea of creating a single federation for the whole Basque Country was considered, but for various reasons this was not done at that time. In 1988 the Basque Football Federacion was finally created, encompassing the original provincial federations as well as a new one for Álava (split off from Gipuzkoa the previous year), each of which continues to organise football competitions within their area.

Purpose
The Basque Football Federation's purpose is to promote, organise and authorise association football competition across the Basque Country autonomous region.

In addition to this, it selects and arranges fixtures for the Basque Country national football team l, for which it aims to gain UEFA and FIFA affiliation so that it can participate in regular international competitions.

FIFA affiliation
The Basque Football Federation has as one of its aims the official participation of the Basque Country national team in international competitions.

In 1979, Pablo Porta, president of the Spanish Football Federation, stated that the Basque Country might participate in the next World Cup; he explained that in the same way that Welsh clubs participate in the English league but are also represented by the Wales national team, so the same model could be used in Spain. However this idea has not been implemented.

In 2010, the Basque Football Federation changed its statutes to claim responsibility for international competitions in the greater Basque Country, but the Supreme Court of Spain suspended these new statutes.

In 2012, it was decided by the Constitutional Court of Spain that the Basque Country could compete in international competitions so long as it did not compete against Spain.

In early 2019, the Federation voted in favour of applying to FIFA and UEFA for official recognition for the team.

In December 2020, Basque federation applied for UEFA and FIFA recognition.

Competitions
The Basque Football Federation organises the following competitions:
Tercera División, Group 4
RFEF Basque tournament (Regional phase of the Federation Cup)
Copa Vasca Juvenil (Basque Youth Cup)
Liga Vasca Juvenil (Basque Youth League)
Liga Vasca Cadete
Copa Vasca Cadete
Liga Vasca Femenina (Basque Women's Football League)
Copa Vasca Femenina (Basque Women's Cup)
Liga Vasca de Fútbol Sala (Basque Futsal league)

Champions
These tables provide the winners of the competitions administered by the Basque Football Federation each season.

Tercera División
Winners of the Basque Country fourth tier group, with possible promotion to the level above and an entry to the following season's Copa del Rey.

Women

Liga Vasca Femenina
The Liga Vasca (Basque League) was introduced (along with other regional sections) in the 2012–13 season as a stage between the provincial leagues and the Segunda División, which is also divided into geographical groups. The table also shows the winner of the promotion playoff between the Álava, Gipuzkoa and Biscay leagues in the seasons prior to the introduction of the all-Basque league.

Copa Vasca Femenina

The Copa Vasca (Basque Cup) has been held since the 1980s. In its current incarnation, it is usually disputed between clubs from the region who are not in the Primera División; the senior team of Athletic Bilbao have never taken part since their formation in 2002, although their B-team has featured in several finals.

From 2020, the Copa Vasca was incorporated as 'Group B' of the Copa Euskal Herria (Basque Country Cup), which does include top division clubs – all of the finals of that competition have featured Athletic Club and Real Sociedad.

Notable clubs affiliated to BFF 
(as of 2021–22 season)
La Liga
Deportivo Alavés
Athletic Bilbao
Real Sociedad de Fútbol

Segunda División
SD Amorebieta
SD Eibar
Real Sociedad B

Primera División RFEF
Athletic Bilbao B
Real Unión

Segunda División RFEF
Arenas Club de Getxo
Gernika Club
Sestao River Club
Real Sociedad C

Primera División (women)
Deportivo Alavés Gloriosas
Athletic Club (women)
SD Eibar (women)
Real Sociedad (women)

Segunda División Pro (women)
Athletic Club Femenino B

Presidents
Laurentzi Gana Gorozika (1992–?)
Iñaki Dobaran Garetxana (2006–2009)
Santiago Arostegi Oleagordia (2009–2012)
Luis Maria Elustondo Ciarreta (2012–present)

See also
Basque football derbies
List of Basque footballers
List of Spanish regional football federations
Football in the Basque Country

References

External links 
 
 Alava Football Federation
 Gipuzkoa Football Federation
 Biscay Football Federation

Spanish football associations
Football in the Basque Country (autonomous community)
1988 establishments in Spain
Sports organizations established in 1988
1980s establishments in the Basque Country (autonomous community)